Gruzinsky was a title and later the surname of two different princely lines of the Bagrationi dynasty of Georgia, both of which received it as subjects of the Russian Empire. The name "Gruzinsky" (also spelled Gruzinski or Gruzinskii) derives from the Russian language, originally and literally meaning "of Georgia". Of the two lines, the younger one is the only line that still exists.

Elder line
The "Elder House" of Princes Gruzinsky was an offshoot of the House of Mukhrani that was dispossessed of the throne of Kartli in 1726. The line descended from Prince Bakar of Georgia (1699/1700-1750), who had removed to Russia in 1724, and it became extinct with the death of Pyotr Gruzinsky (1837–1892). The family had estates in the governorates of Moscow and Nizhegorod, and it was confirmed among the princely nobility of Russia in 1833.

Younger line
The "Younger House" of Princes Gruzinsky (Bagrationi-Gruzinski) is an offshoot of the House of Kakheti (after 1462) and of Kartli (after 1744). The title of Prince(ss) Gruzinsky (Serene Prince[ss] after 1865) was conferred upon the grandchildren of the penultimate Georgian king, Erekle II (1720/1-1798), after the Russian annexation of Georgia in 1801. Descendants of Prince Bagrat (1776–1841), grandson of Erekle II and son of the last king of Georgia, George XII (1746–1800), still survive in Georgia.

The current head of this family, Nugzar Bagration-Gruzinsky (born 1950), claims the legitimate headship of the Royal House of Georgia (also claimed by the genealogically senior line of Bagrations of Mukhrani) based on male primogeniture descent from the last king of Kartli-Kakheti in eastern Georgia. As Nugzar has no male issue, Yevgeny Petrovich Gruzinsky (born 1947-died 17 July 2018), the great-great grandson of Bagrat's younger brother Ilia (1791–1854), who lived in the Russian Federation, was considered to be Nugzar's heir presumptive within the primogeniture principle. Yevgeny died without issue. Nugzar himself argues in favor of having his eldest daughter, Ana, designated as his heir in accordance with the Georgian dynastic law of "Zedsidzeoba" according to which every child of Princess Ana would inherit eligibility for dynastic succession through their mother, thus continuing the elder line of George XII.

References

External links
 
 Bagrationi-Gruzinski website

Bagrationi dynasty of the Kingdom of Kartli-Kakheti
Russian noble families
Branches of the Bagrationi dynasty
House of Mukhrani